Franco Brambilla (27 November 1923 – 28 July 2003) was an Italian prelate of the Catholic Church who worked in the diplomatic service of the Holy See.

Life
Brambilla was born in Brugherio on 27 November 1923 and was ordained a priest on 29 August 1947.

To prepare for a diplomatic career he entered the Pontifical Ecclesiastical Academy in 1950. His early assignments in the diplomatic service included a stint in the United States.

He was appointed Titular Archbishop of Viminacium and Apostolic Pro-Nuncio to Tanzania on 24 December 1970.

On 21 November 1981 he became the Apostolic Nuncio to Uruguay.

His final appointment was on 22 February 1986 as Apostolic Pro-Nuncio to Australia. There he defended the Vatican's response to allegations of clerical sexual abuse, while later testimony documented his knowledge of the case of George Riashi, a bishop who was promoted despite a record of abuse. In 1998, when Vatican prescriptions on the use of lay ministers faced criticism in Australia, he called for submission to the rules as unquestionable and authoritative church teaching.

He retired on 3 December 1998 with the appointment of Francesco Canalini to succeed him in Australia.

He died on 28 July 2003.

References

External links
Catholic Hierarchy: Archbishop Franco Brambilla

1923 births
2003 deaths
Italian Roman Catholic archbishops
People from Brugherio
20th-century Italian titular bishops
Apostolic Nuncios to Tanzania
Apostolic Nuncios to Uruguay
Apostolic Nuncios to Australia
Italian expatriates in the United States
Italian expatriates in Uruguay
Italian expatriates in Australia